Clair F. Gill (born July 7, 1943) is a retired United States Army major general who served as Commandant of the U.S. Army Engineer School.

References

1943 births
Living people
United States Army generals